Jubaneh (also Romanized as Jūbaneh, Joobeneh, Jubnaeh, and Jūboneh; also known as Dzhubane) is a village in Eslamabad Rural District, Sangar District, Rasht County, Gilan Province, Iran. At the 2006 census, its population was 1,407, in 388 families.

References 

Populated places in Rasht County